Hypselobarbus gracilis is a species of cyprinid in the genus Hypselobarbus.

References

 

Cyprinidae
Fish of India
Cyprinid fish of Asia
Fish described in 1849